Atlantic: The Wildest Ocean on Earth (also known as Wild Atlantic for European release) is a three-part BBC nature documentary series exploring the natural history of the Atlantic Ocean. It was first broadcast on BBC Two and BBC Two HD in the United Kingdom. A ten-minute making-of feature Atlantic Diaries airs at the end of each episode, taking the total running time to 60 minutes. In English speaking territories the show is narrated by Irish actor Cillian Murphy. The series will broadcast internationally on BBC Earth.

Episodes

References

External links
 

2015 British television series debuts
BBC television documentaries
BBC high definition shows
Documentary films about marine biology
2015 British television series endings